The 1994 Pittsburgh Steelers season was the franchise's 62nd season as a professional sports franchise and as a member of the National Football League.

This season marked as their third consecutive trip to the playoffs under head coach Bill Cowher. For the second time in Cowher's three seasons as head coach of the Steelers the team was the top seed in the AFC playoffs. Pittsburgh won its first playoff game since 1989 with a win in the divisional playoffs over their division rival Cleveland Browns, but failed to advance to the Super Bowl after losing to the San Diego Chargers in the AFC Championship Game.

Offseason

NFL draft

Staff

Notable additions include Bam Morris, Jason Gildon and Brenston Buckner

Roster

Preseason

Schedule

Regular season

Schedule

Standings

Game summaries

Week 1 (Sunday September 4, 1994): vs. Dallas Cowboys

at Three Rivers Stadium, Pittsburgh, Pennsylvania

 Game time: 4:00 pm EDT
 Game weather: 68 °F (Partly cloudy)
 Game attendance: 60,156
 Referee: Bob McElwee
 TV announcers: (FOX) Pat Summerall (play by play), John Madden (color commentator)

Scoring drives:

 Dallas – FG Boniol 40
 Dallas – FG Boniol 31
 Pittsburgh – FG Anderson 41
 Dallas – Johnston 2 pass from Aikman (Boniol kick)
 Dallas – FG Boniol 21
 Dallas – FG Boniol 32
 Pittsburgh – O'Donnell 2 run (pass failed)
 Dallas – E. Smith 2 run (Boniol kick)

Week 2 (Sunday September 11, 1994): at Cleveland Browns

at Cleveland Municipal Stadium, Cleveland, Ohio

 Game time: 1:00 pm EDT
 Game weather:Sunny 
 Game attendance: 77,774
 Referee: Ron Blum
 TV announcers: (NBC) Tom Hammond (play by play), Cris Collinsworth (color commentator)

Scoring drives:

 Cleveland – Reeves 1 pass from Testaverde (Stover kick)
 Cleveland – FG Stover 23
 Pittsburgh – Thigpen 31 pass from O'Donnell (Anderson kick)
 Pittsburgh – Foster 1 run (Anderson kick)
 Pittsburgh – FG Anderson 25

Week 3 (Sunday September 18, 1994): vs. Indianapolis Colts

at Three Rivers Stadium, Pittsburgh, Pennsylvania

 Game time: 1:00 pm EDT
 Game weather: 66 °F (Mostly sunny)
 Game attendance: 54,040
 Referee: Gerry Austin
 TV announcers: (NBC) Don Criqui (play by play), Beasley Reece (color commentator)

Scoring drives:

 Indianapolis – Humphrey 95 kickoff return (Biasucci kick)
 Indianapolis – Coryatt 78 fumble return (Biasucci kick)
 Pittsburgh – Green 27 pass from O'Donnell (Anderson kick)
 Pittsburgh – Foster 29 run (Anderson kick)
 Pittsburgh – FG Anderson 46
 Indianapolis – Dawkins 19 pass from Harbaugh (Biasucci kick)
 Pittsburgh – Williams 8 pass from O'Donnell (Anderson kick)
 Pittsburgh – Morris 1 run (Anderson kick)

Week 4 (Sunday September 25, 1994): at Seattle Seahawks

at Husky Stadium, Seattle, Washington

 Game time: 6:00 pm EDT
 Game weather:
 Game attendance: 59,637
 Referee: Red Cashion
 TV announcers: (NBC – Local) Don Criqui (play by play), Todd Christensen (color commentator)

This game was played at Husky Stadium due to ceiling tiles falling off in the Kingdome.

Scoring drives:

 Seattle – Warren 3 run (Kasay kick)
 Pittsburgh – FG Anderson 31
 Seattle – FG Kasay 31
 Seattle – Junkin 1 pass from Mirer (Kasay kick)
 Seattle – FG Kasay 40
 Pittsburgh – FG Anderson 38
 Seattle – Watters 35 interception return (Kasay kick)
 Pittsburgh – C. Johnson 36 pass from O'Donnell (Anderson kick)
 Seattle – FG Kasay 31

Week 5 (Monday October 3, 1994): vs. Houston Oilers

at Three Rivers Stadium, Pittsburgh, Pennsylvania

 Game time: 9:00 pm EDT
 Game weather: 51 °F (Clear)
 Game attendance: 57,274
 Referee: Larry Nemmers
 TV announcers: (ABC) Al Michaels (play by play), Frank Gifford & Dan Dierdorf (color commentators), Lynn Swann (sideline reporter)

Scoring drives:

 Pittsburgh – FG Anderson 42
 Pittsburgh – FG Anderson 25
 Pittsburgh – E. Green 3 pass from O'Donnell (Anderson kick)
 Pittsburgh – Foster 1 run (Anderson kick)
 Pittsburgh – FG Anderson 22
 Pittsburgh – Morris 2 run (Anderson kick)
 Houston – Givins 76 pass from Richardson (Del Greco kick)
 Houston – Jeffires 2 pass from Richardson (Del Greco kick)

Week 6 (Sunday October 9, 1994): Bye Week

Week 7 (Sunday October 16, 1994): vs. Cincinnati Bengals

at Three Rivers Stadium, Pittsburgh, Pennsylvania

 Game time: 1:00 pm EDT
 Game weather: 67 °F (Mostly sunny)
 Game attendance: 55,353
 Referee: Johnny Grier
 TV announcers: (NBC) Don Criqui (play by play), Beasley Reece (color commentator)

Scoring drives:

 Pittsburgh – Williams 13 pass from O'Donnell (Anderson kick)
 Pittsburgh – Mills 14 pass from O'Donnell (Anderson kick)
 Cincinnati – Cothran 7 pass from Johnson (Pelfrey kick)
 Cincinnati – FG Pelfrey 47

Week 8 (Sunday October 23, 1994): at New York Giants

at Giants Stadium, East Rutherford, New Jersey

 Game time: 1:00 pm EDT
 Game weather:
 Game attendance: 71,819
 Referee: Bernie Kukar
 TV announcers: (NBC) Dick Enberg (play by play), Bob Trumpy (color commentator)

Scoring drives:

 New York Giants – FG Treadwell 19
 New York Giants – FG Daluiso 49
 Pittsburgh – FG Anderson 29
 Pittsburgh – Morris 6 run (Anderson kick)

Week 9 (Sunday October 30, 1994): at Arizona Cardinals

at Sun Devil Stadium, Tempe, Arizona

 Game time: 8:00 pm EST
 Game weather:
 Game attendance: 65,690
 Referee: Ron Blum
 TV announcers: (TNT) Gary Bender (play by play), Pat Haden (color commentator)

Scoring drives:

 Arizona – Centers 4 run (Davis kick)
 Pittsburgh – Morris 11 run (Anderson kick)
 Arizona – FG Davis 20
 Pittsburgh – Thigpen 60 pass from O'Donnell (Anderson kick)
 Arizona – Moore 1 run (Davis kick)
 Pittsburgh – FG Anderson 23
 Arizona – FG Davis 51

Week 10 (Sunday November 6, 1994): at Houston Oilers

at Astrodome, Houston

 Game time: 1:00 pm EST
 Game weather: Dome
 Game attendance: 47,822
 Referee: Jerry Markbreit
 TV announcers: (NBC) Don Criqui (play by play), Todd Christensen (color commentator)

Scoring drives:

 Houston – FG Del Greco 32
 Pittsburgh – FG Anderson 50
 Pittsburgh – FG Anderson 39
 Houston – FG Del Greco 49
 Pittsburgh – FG Anderson 37
 Houston – FG Del Greco 38
 Pittsburgh – FG Anderson 40

Week 11 (Monday November 14, 1994): vs. Buffalo Bills

at Three Rivers Stadium, Pittsburgh, Pennsylvania

 Game time: 9:00 pm EST
 Game weather: 64 °F (Cloudy)
 Game attendance: 59,019
 Referee: Ed Hochuli
 TV announcers: (ABC) Al Michaels (play by play), Frank Gifford & Dan Dierdorf (color commentators), Lynn Swann (sideline reporter)

Scoring drives:

 Pittsburgh – FG Anderson 39
 Pittsburgh – Woodson 37 interception return (Anderson kick)
 Pittsburgh – FG Anderson 39
 Buffalo – FG Christie 52
 Pittsburgh – FG Anderson 30
 Buffalo – Reed 19 pass from Kelly (Christie kick)
 Pittsburgh – G. Williams recovered fumble in end zone (Anderson kick)

Week 12 (Sunday November 20, 1994): vs. Miami Dolphins

at Three Rivers Stadium, Pittsburgh, Pennsylvania

 Game time: 1:00 pm EST
 Game weather: 55 °F (Partly sunny)
 Game attendance: 59,148
 Referee: Tom White
 TV announcers: (NBC) Jim Lampley (play by play), Todd Christensen (color commentator)

Scoring drives:

 PIttsburgh – FG Anderson 19
 Miami – Jackson 2 pass from Marino (Stoyanovich kick)
 Pittsburgh – FG Anderson 48
 Miami – FG Stoyanovich 34
 Pittsburgh – Foster 10 run (Anderson kick)
 Miami – FG Stoyanovich 48
 Pittsburgh – FG Anderson 39

Week 13 (Sunday November 27, 1994): at Los Angeles Raiders

at Los Angeles Memorial Coliseum, Los Angeles

 Game time: 4:00 pm EST
 Game weather:
 Game attendance: 58,327
 Referee: Red Cashion
 TV announcers: (NBC) Charlie Jones (play by play), Randy Cross (color commentator)

Scoring drives:

 Pittsburgh – Thigpen 27 pass from Tomczak (Anderson kick)
 Los Angeles Raiders – FG Jaeger 32
 Pittsburgh – Green 15 pass from Tomczak (Anderson kick)
 Pittsburgh – Morris 3 run (Anderson kick)

Week 14 (Sunday December 4, 1994): at Cincinnati Bengals

at Riverfront Stadium, Cincinnati

 Game time: 1:00 pm EST
 Game weather:
 Game attendance: 53,401
 Referee: Gordon McCarter
 TV announcers: (NBC) Charlie Jones (play by play), Randy Cross (color commentator)

Scoring drives:

 Pittsburgh – Morris 1 run (Anderson kick)
 Cincinnati – Pickens 7 pass from Blake (Pelfrey kick)
 Pittsburgh – Green 5 pass from O'Donnell (Anderson kick)
 Pittsburgh – Morris 8 run (Anderson kick)
 Pittsburgh – FG Anderson 41
 Pittsburgh – Woodson 27 interception return (Anderson kick)
 Cincinnati – Blake 5 run (Blake run)
 Pittsburgh – Hayes 3 pass from O'Donnell (Anderson kick)

Week 15 (Sunday December 11, 1994): vs. Philadelphia Eagles

at Three Rivers Stadium, Pittsburgh, Pennsylvania

 Game time: 1:00 pm EST
 Game weather: 31 °F (Flurries)
 Game attendance: 55,474
 Referee: Bob McElwee
 TV announcers: (FOX) Kevin Harlan (play by play), Jerry Glanville (color commentator)

Scoring drives:

 Philadelphia – FG Murray 21
 Pittsburgh – Hastings 18 pass from O'Donnell (Anderson kick)
 Pittsburgh – Williams 3 run (Anderson kick)

Week 16 (Sunday December 18, 1994): vs. Cleveland Browns

at Three Rivers Stadium, Pittsburgh, Pennsylvania

 Game time: 4:00 pm EST
 Game weather: 38 °F (Cloudy)
 Game attendance: 60,808
 Referee: Ed Hochuli
 TV announcers: (NBC) Charlie Jones (play by play), Randy Cross (color commentator)

Scoring drives:

 PIttsburgh – Thigpen 40 pass from O'Donnell (Anderson kick)
 Pittsburgh – Foster 1 run (Anderson kick)
 Cleveland – Carrier 14 pass from Testaverde (Stover kick)
 Pittsburgh – FG Anderson 49

Week 17 (Saturday December 24, 1994): at San Diego Chargers

at Jack Murphy Stadium, San Diego

 Game time: 4:00 pm EST
 Game weather:
 Game attendance: 58,379
 Referee: Dick Hantak
 TV announcers: (NBC) Jim Lampley (play by play), Todd Christensen (color commentator)

Scoring drives:

 San Diego – FG Carney 37
 Pittsburgh – FG Anderson 28
 San Diego – Coleman 90 kickoff return (Carney kick)
 Pittsburgh – FG Anderson 28
 Pittsburgh – C. Johnson 19 pass from O'Donnell (Anderson kick)
 San Diego – Seay 2 pass from Humphries (Carney kick)
 San Diego – Means 2 run (Carney kick)
 Pittsburgh – McAffee 6 run (pass failed)
 Pittsburgh – C. Johnson 84 pass from Tomczak (Stone pass from Tomczak)
 San Diego – FG Carney 40
 Pittsburgh – Hastings 11 pass from Tomczak (Anderson kick)
 San Diego – Means 20 run (Carney kick)
 San Diego – FG Carney 32

Playoffs

Game summaries

AFC Divisional Playoff (Saturday January 7, 1995): vs. Cleveland Browns

at Three Rivers Stadium, Pittsburgh, Pennsylvania

 Game time: 12:30 pm EST
 Game weather: 29 °F (Light snow)
 Game attendance: 58,185
 Referee: Bob McElwee
 TV announcers: (NBC) Marv Albert (play by play), Paul Maguire (color commentator)

Scoring drives:

 Pittsburgh – FG Anderson 39
 Pittsburgh – Green 2 pass from O'Donnell (Anderson kick)
 Pittsburgh – a Williams 26 run (Anderson kick)
 Cleveland – FG Stover 22
 Pittsburgh – Thigpen 9 pass from O'Donnell (Anderson kick)
 Pittsburgh – FG Anderson 40
 Cleveland – McCardell 20 pass from Testaverde (pass failed)
 Pittsburgh – Safety, Lake sacked Testaverde in end zone

AFC Championship Game (Sunday January 15, 1995): vs. San Diego Chargers

at Three Rivers Stadium, Pittsburgh, Pennsylvania

 Game time: 12:30 pm EST
 Game weather: 59 °F (Rain & Fog)
 Game attendance: 61,545
 Referee: Gerry Austin
 TV announcers: (NBC) Dick Enberg (play by play), Bob Trumpy (color commentator)

Scoring drives:

 PIttsburgh – Williams 16 pass form O'Donnell (Anderson kick)
 San Diego – FG Carney 20
 Pittsburgh – FG Anderson 39
 Pittsburgh – FG Anderson 23
 San Diego – Pupunu 43 pass from Humphries (Carney kick)
 San Diego – Martin 43 pass from Humphries (Carney kick)

Honors and awards

Pro Bowl Representatives
See: 1995 Pro Bowl

 No. 26 Rod Woodson-Cornerback
 No. 37 Carnell Lake-Safety
 No. 63 Dermontti Dawson-Center
 No. 67 Duval Love-Offensive Guard
 No. 86 Eric Green-Tight End
 No. 91 Kevin Greene-Outside Linebacker
 No. 95 Greg Lloyd-Outside Linebacker

References

External links
 1994 Pittsburgh Steelers season at Pro Football Reference 
 1994 Pittsburgh Steelers season statistics at jt-sw.com 

Pittsburgh Steelers seasons
Pittsburgh Steelers
AFC Central championship seasons
Pitts